Tom Haydock may refer to:
 Tom Haydock (English footballer) (fl. 1890s), English footballer
 Tom Haydock (Scottish footballer) (1890–1918), Scottish footballer

See also
Thomas Haydock
 Haydock (surname)